Poznań Wola railway station is a railway station serving the city of Poznań, in the Greater Poland Voivodeship, Poland. The station opened in 1902 and is located on the Poznań–Szczecin railway. The train services are operated by Przewozy Regionalne.

Train services
The station is served by the following service(s):

Regional services (R) Swinoujscie - Szczecin - Stargard - Dobiegniew - Krzyz - Wronki - Poznan
Regional services (R) Kostrzyn - Gorzow Wielkopolski - Krzyz - Wronki - Poznan

References

 This article is based upon a translation of the Polish language version as of October 2016.

External links

Railway stations in Poland opened in 1902
Railway stations in Greater Poland Voivodeship
Wola